Ching is a unisex given name of Chinese origin which may refer to:

 Ching He Huang (born 1978), British-Taiwanese food writer and TV chef often referred to simply as Ching
 Ching Ho Cheng (1946-1989), Cuban-born American artist
 Ho Ching (born 1953), Chief Executive Officer of Temasek Holdings since 2002, wife of Prime Minister of Singapore Lee Hsien Loong
 Li Ching (actress) (born 1948), Chinese actress
 Li Ching (table tennis) (born 1975), Chinese table tennis player
 Ching W. Tang (born 1947), Hong Kong-born American physical chemist
 You Ching (born 1942), Taiwanese politician, lawyer and former magistrate

Chinese given names
Unisex given names